In law an administrator (or administratrix for women) can be:
 a person appointed by the court to handle the estate of someone who died without a will (administrator of an estate).
 In United Kingdom bankruptcy law, an office holder appointed under an Administration Order in relation to a company in financial difficulty, as an alternative to liquidation.

See also
Beswick v. Beswick
De bonis non administratis

English contract law